Max and Moritz: A Story of Seven Boyish Pranks (original: Max und Moritz – Eine Bubengeschichte in sieben Streichen) is a German language illustrated story in verse. This highly inventive, blackly humorous tale, told entirely in rhymed couplets, was written and illustrated by Wilhelm Busch and published in 1865. It is among the early works of Busch, yet it already featured many substantial, effectually aesthetic and formal regularities, procedures and basic patterns of Busch's later works. Many familiar with comic strip history consider it to have been the direct inspiration for the Katzenjammer Kids and Quick & Flupke. The German title satirizes the German custom of giving a subtitle to the name of dramas in the form of "Ein Drama in ... Akten" (A Drama in ... Acts), which became dictum in colloquial usage for any event with an unpleasant or dramatic course, e.g. "Bundespräsidentenwahl - Ein Drama in drei Akten" ("Federal Presidential Elections - A drama in three acts").

Cultural significance 
Busch's classic tale of the terrible duo (now in the public domain) has since become a proud part of the culture in German-speaking countries. Even today, parents usually read these tales to their not-yet-literate children. To this day in Germany, Austria, and Switzerland, a certain familiarity with the story and its rhymes is still presumed, as it is often referenced in mass communication. The two leering faces are synonymous with mischief, and appear almost logo-like in advertising and even graffiti.

During World War I, the Red Baron, Manfred von Richthofen, named his dog Moritz, giving the name Max to another animal given to his friend.

The two Sturer Emil vehicles produced in World War II were named Max and Moritz by their crews. These names can be seen in use in one of the documented engagements they took part in.

Max and Moritz became the forerunners to the comic strip. The story inspired Rudolph Dirks to create The Katzenjammer Kids, which would in turn serve as inspiration for Art Clokey to create his antagonists for Gumby, the Blockheads. 

Story has it that Max and Moritz (along with The Katzenjammer Kids) also served as inspiration for Ragdoll Productions' British children's show Rosie and Jim, Mike Judge's animated series Beavis and Butt-Head, Terrence and Phillip of the Terrence and Phillip Show from South Park (the show's creators, Trey Parker and Matt Stone, having said South Park was inspired by Beavis and Butt-Head), and George Beard and Harold Hutchins in the "Captain Underpants" series by Dav Pilkey.

After World War II, German-U.S. composer Richard Mohaupt, together with choreographer , created , a burlesque dance, which premiered at Badisches Staatstheater Karlsruhe on December 18, 1949.

In the early 2020s, The Efteling amusement Park would close the former Swiss Bob attraction due to being hard to operate and reportedly had some maintenance issues including technical failures, and replace it with a new Mack Rides family-friendly dueling steel powered rollercoaster named Max & Moritz, based on the German children's story of the same name.

Max and Moritz are featured in The Defeated, a streaming television series distributed by Netflix in 2021. Set in 1946, in post-war Berlin, the two main characters are brothers named "Max" and "Moritz", and the book Max and Moritz: A Story of Seven Boyish Pranks also features prominently throughout the series.

The pranks 

There have been several English translations of the original German verses over the years, but all have maintained the original trochaic tetrameter:

Preface 
Ah, how oft we read or hear of 
Boys we almost stand in fear of!
For example, take these stories
Of two youths, named Max and Moritz,
Who, instead of early turning
Their young minds to useful learning,
Often leered with horrid features
At their lessons and their teachers.

Look now at the empty head: he
Is for mischief always ready.
Teasing creatures - climbing fences,
Stealing apples, pears, and quinces,
Is, of course, a deal more pleasant,
And far easier for the present,
Than to sit in schools or churches,
Fixed like roosters on their perches

But O dear, O dear, O deary,
When the end comes sad and dreary!
'Tis a dreadful thing to tell
That on Max and Moritz fell!
All they did this book rehearses,
Both in pictures and in verses.

First Trick: The Widow 

The boys tie several crusts of bread together with thread, and lay this trap in the chicken yard of Bolte (or "Tibbets" in the English version), an old widow, causing all the chickens to become fatally entangled.

This prank is remarkably similar to the eighth history of the classic German prankster tales of Till Eulenspiegel.

Second Trick: The Widow II 

As the widow cooks her chickens, the boys sneak onto her roof. When she leaves her kitchen momentarily, the boys steal the chickens using a fishing pole down the chimney. The widow hears her dog ("Spitz" in the English version) barking and hurries upstairs, finds the hearth empty and beats the dog.

Third Trick: The Tailor 

The boys torment Böck (or "Buck" in the English version), a well-liked tailor who has a fast stream flowing in front of his house. They saw through the planks of his wooden bridge, making a precarious gap, then taunt him by making goat noises (a pun on his name being similar to the zoological expression 'buck'; in the English version they use his name for a straight pun), until he runs outside. The bridge breaks; the tailor is swept away and nearly drowns (but for two geese, which he grabs a hold of and which fly high to safety).

Although Till removes the planks of the bridge instead of sawing them there are some similarities to Till Eulenspiegel (32nd History).

Fourth Trick: The Teacher 

While their devout teacher, Lämpel, is busy at church, the boys invade his home and fill his favorite pipe with gunpowder. When he lights the pipe, the blast knocks him unconscious, blackens his skin and burns away all his hair. But: "Time that comes will quick repair; yet the pipe retains its share."

Fifth Trick: The Uncle 

The boys collect bags full of May bugs, which they promptly deposit in their Uncle Fritz's bed. Uncle is nearly asleep when he feels the bugs walking on his nose. Horrified, he goes into a frenzy, killing them all before going back to sleep.

Sixth Trick: The Baker 

The boys invade a closed bakery to steal some Easter sweets. Attempting to steal pretzels, they fall into a vat of dough. The baker returns, catches the breaded pair, and bakes them. But they survive, and escape by gnawing through their crusts.

Final Trick: The Farmer 

Hiding out in the grain storage area of a farmer, Mecke (unnamed in the English version), the boys slit some grain sacks. Carrying away one of the sacks, farmer Mecke immediately notices the problem. He puts the boys in the sack instead, then takes it to the mill. The boys are ground to bits and devoured by the miller's ducks. Later, no one expresses regret.

Media
Max und Moritz was adapted into a ballet by Richard Mohaupt and Alfredo Bortuluzzi. In 1956 Norbert Schultze adapted it into a straightforward children's film, Max and Moritz (1956).

Film and television

Animated
 Spuk mit Max und Moritz (1951), by Diehl Film, a production company lead by brothers ,  and 
  (1978) by Halas and Batchelor
 Max und Moritz (TV series, 39 episodes, 1999)

Live action
 Max and Moritz (1956)
  (1965)
  (2005)

Literature
Der Fall Max und Moritz, 1988 by Jörg M. Günther, a satirical treatment in which the various misdeeds in the story – both by the protagonists and their surroundings – are analyzed via the regulations of the German Strafgesetzbuch.

References

External links 

 in German for a single work
Max und Moritz 
Max & Maurice, a Juvenile History in Seven Tricks (German/English) App for iPad iPhone iPod, told with animated pictures and readout function

Literary duos
Comic strip duos
German comic strips
German children's literature
Fictional German people
Fictional tricksters
German comics characters
Comedy literature characters
Humor comics
Gag-a-day comics
Text comics
1860s comics
1865 books
Child characters in comics
Male characters in comics
Child characters in literature
Male characters in literature
Public domain comics
Comics characters introduced in 1865
Comics adapted into television series
Comics adapted into animated series
Comics adapted into plays
German comics adapted into films
1860s children's books